A tornadic vortex signature, abbreviated TVS, is a Pulse-Doppler radar weather radar detected rotation algorithm that indicates the likely presence of a strong mesocyclone that is in some stage of tornadogenesis. It may give meteorologists the ability to pinpoint and track the location of tornadic rotation within a larger storm, but it is not an important feature in the National Weather Service's warning operations.

The tornadic vortex signature was first identified by Donald W. Burgess, Leslie R. Lemon, and Rodger A. Brown in the 1970s using experimental Doppler radar at the National Severe Storms Laboratory (NSSL) in Norman, Oklahoma. The National Weather Service (NWS) now uses an updated algorithm developed by NSSL, the tornado detection algorithm (TDA) based on data from its WSR-88D system of radars. NSSL also developed the mesocyclone detection algorithm (MDA).

Display

The conditions causing a TVS are often visible on the Doppler weather radar storm relative velocity (SRV) product as adjacent inbound and outbound velocities, a signature known as a velocity couplet or "gate-to-gate" shear. In most cases, the TVS is a strong mesocyclone aloft, not an actual tornado, although the presence of an actual tornado on the ground can occasionally be inferred based on a strong couplet in concert with a tornado debris signature (TDS) (i.e. a "debris ball" on reflectivity or certain polarimetric characteristics), or through confirmation from storm spotters. When the algorithm is tripped, a TVS icon (typically a triangle representing a vortex) and pertinent information appear. Radar analysis of the velocity couplet as well as the automated TVS are very significant to issuing tornado warnings and can suggest the strength and location of possible tornadoes. Although many tornadoes, especially the stronger ones, coincide with a TVS, many weak EF0-EF1 tornadoes can and do occur without a TVS, especially if they are not produced from an identified mesocyclone. Likewise, phenomena such as "fair-weather" waterspouts, landspouts, and gustnadoes, though cyclonic and occasionally damaging, do not normally produce a signature identifiable by a TVS. Rotation associated with quasi-linear convective systems (QLCSs) or squall lines can trip the TVS but do so less reliably as the couplets typically are more transient, are shallower, smaller, and weaker. This rotation may be considered a mesovortex rather than a mesocyclone but these do produce tornadoes and damaging straight-line winds.

Intensity
A TVS can be measured by intense gate to gate wind shear, which is the change of wind speed and/or direction across the two gates of inbound and outbound velocities. Gates are the individual pixels on the radar display. The impressiveness of a TVS not only has to do with the strength of the gate to gate shear, but it also incorporates the size and depth of the TVS, and the strength of any surrounding mesocyclone, among other factors, including several vertically-polarized variables with the advent of dual-polarization.

See also 
 Convective storm detection
 Hook echo
 Bounded weak echo region (BWER)
 Warning Decision Training Branch, Cooperative Institute for Mesoscale Meteorological Studies, Center for Analysis and Prediction of Storms, Advanced Radar Research Center

Notes

References

External links 
 Tornado Vortex Signatures in Doppler radial velocity patterns

Severe weather and convection
Radar meteorology